Ernestine Gwet-Bell (born 1953) is a gynaecologist from Cameroon, who supervised the first successful in vitro fertilisation (IVF) treatment in Cameroon.

Early life 
Gwet-Bell was born in 1953 in Sackbayémé, in the department of Sanaga Maritime, Cameroon. Her father was initially a Catholic priest, but converted to become a Protestant pastor; her mother was a nurse and midwife. One of six brothers and sisters, she studied medicine at the University of Paris 5.  Her first job was at the Council of Baptist and Evangelical Churches Hospital in Bonabéri, which was affiliated to the church she attended; she also worked at the Laquintinie Hospital.

Career

Gynaecology 
In 1987 she opened a private practice, the Odyssey Clinic, in Douala, which as of 2020 was one on of Cameroon's most respected gynaecological medical facilities. Alongside five other colleagues she founded Cameroon's first assisted fertility centre: Centre des Techniques de Pointe en Gynécologie-Obstétrique; her co-founders are: Berthe Bollo, Guy Sandjon, Monique Onomo, Nicole Akoung and Christian Pamy. In 2016, the first public IVF centre opened in Yaounde. Gwet-Bell was its director in 2020. In   

In 1998, Gwet-Bell supervised the birth of the first Cameroonian child born through in vitro fertilization. The baby was called Thommy. In 2004, her team were able to successfully  practice Intracytoplasmic Sperm Injection (ICSI), an innovative technique designed in 1992 to fight against male sterility in the context of IVF. As of August 2007, she a'nd her team were responsible for the birth of 500 babies through in vitro fertilization. She is President of the Inter-African Fertility Study, Research and Application Group, as well as the union of private doctors in Cameroon. 

In 2019 she chaired the organisational committee of a conference which brought together gynaecologists and neonatal specialist from across Cameroon together.

Autism 
One of her nephews has autism and in 2005 she founded Orchidée Home, which is designed to support autistic children and their parents. Two years later, in 2007, she organized the first autism congress in Cameroon.

Selected publications 

 'The 5 main challenges faced in infertility care in Cameroon' Global Reproductive Health (2018).
 'Prise en charge chirurgicale de l'infertilité : moyens et spécificités en Afrique sub saharienne' in Reproduction Humaine et Hormones (2013).
 'Traitement médical de la femme infertile en Afrique' in Reproduction Humaine et Hormones (2013).

Personal life 
Gwet Bell is married and has two daughters and a son.

References

External links 
 Dr Ernestine Gwet Bell se raconte

Living people
1953 births
Cameroonian women
University of Paris alumni
Cameroonian obstetricians and gynaecologists
Autism activists
People from Littoral Region (Cameroon)